The First Congregational Church of Middletown, New York, United States is one of the most visible landmarks of that city's downtown skyline. Its spire rises higher than any other church or structure in the central neighborhoods of the city. Constructed in 1872, this is the third church built by this congregation.

The congregation was established in 1785, after the American Revolutionary War, by migrants who came from New England. The first church was built before residents had even named their settlement of houses and farms. It has been argued that the formation of the church at that time marks the beginning of Middletown's existence as a village. For 40 years it was the only church in the area. The current Gothic Revival building was designed by architect Isaac G. Perry and reflects the ambitions of the prosperous residents of the town of that period.

Gallery

References

External links
Church website

Churches in Orange County, New York
National Register of Historic Places in Orange County, New York
Middletown, Orange County, New York
Churches on the National Register of Historic Places in New York (state)
Religious organizations established in 1785
18th-century Protestant churches
Churches completed in 1872
19th-century churches in the United States
Congregational churches in New York (state)